Enrique Claverol (born 3 June 1965) is a Spanish sports shooter. He competed in two events at the 1992 Summer Olympics.

References

1965 births
Living people
Spanish male sport shooters
Olympic shooters of Spain
Shooters at the 1992 Summer Olympics
Sportspeople from Barcelona
20th-century Spanish people